Pleurodema diplolister, the Peters' four-eyed frog, is a species of frog in the family Leptodactylidae. It is endemic to Brazil.
Its natural habitats are dry savanna, moist savanna, subtropical or tropical dry shrubland, subtropical or tropical dry lowland grassland, intermittent freshwater marshes, sandy shores, and pastureland. It is threatened by habitat loss.
The common name "four-eyed frog" refers to two inguinal poison glands that resemble eyes.  When threatened, the frog lowers its head and raises its rear.  When the frog adopts this posture, the poison glands are also raised toward the predator.  The predator may also confuse the frog's raised posterior for the head of a larger animal.

References

Pleurodema
Endemic fauna of Brazil
Amphibians of Brazil
Frogs of South America
Amphibians described in 1870
Taxa named by Wilhelm Peters
Taxonomy articles created by Polbot